Wrong Cops (Best Of) is a compilation album by Mr. Oizo, released by Ed Banger Records on 24 February 2014. It is a mix of songs from studio albums, extended plays, B-sides, soundtracks Mr. Oizo has co-produced and some unreleased material. The compilation features guest appearances and collaborations from other artists, such as Marilyn Manson, Gaspard Augé of Justice and Sébastien Tellier.

Despite being a best-of compilation, Dupieux' most famous work, "Flat Beat", was not featured.

Track listing

References

2014 compilation albums